The 1978 Canadian Open was the fifth edition of the professional invitational snooker tournament, the Canadian Open, which took place between 16 August and 4 September 1978.

Cliff Thorburn won the title defeating Tony Meo 17–15 in the final.


Main draw

References

1978 in snooker
1979 in snooker
Open
Open